Hamilton High School is a public high school in Memphis, Tennessee, located at 1363 E Person Avenue. Enrollment is 646 as of the 2019–2020 school year and the school is part of the Shelby County School District.

The school has a Junior ROTC program and requires a school uniform.

Hamilton High School graduates were among the Memphis State Eight that broke the color barrier at Memphis State in 1959. There was a clash between students and police during the Martin Luther King era. In 2011 organizers rallied to save the high school from closing.

School colors are royal blue and white. Wildcats are the mascot, and the school motto is "Love Hamilton Absolutely".

Former NFL player Curtis Weathers served as principal in 2015 and sought to transition the school into a Charter School. The school was part of a grade tampering controversy at several Shelby County schools in 2017 and had its principal demoted to a teaching position as a result.

97% of students are black . Student scores are very low on math and reading proficiency state exams.

History

Shooting incidents
 In October 2004, a student fired a gun at another student but missed and no one was injured.
 On February 4, 2008, a student was shot in the leg after an argument by another student in a third floor classroom.
 On August 15, 2012, a person from across the street shot at the students who hit the deck in the school's parking lot. The police believe the shooting was gang related. No one was injured in the incident.
 On April 20, 2018, a coach was shot and carjacked in the schools parking lot.

Notable alumni
Lois DeBerry, state legislator
Young Dolph, rapper
Al Henry, basketball player
Keith Simpson, football cornerback
Bernard Williams, football player
Todd Day, basketball player

References

External links
 

Schools in Memphis, Tennessee
Public high schools in Tennessee